Šta je to u tvojim venama (English: What Is It In Your Veins?), later renamed Kukavica (English: Coward), is the fifth studio album by Serbian singer Ceca. It was released in 1993 on CD and MC. It was soon re-released under the title Kukavica with the song of the same name as the first track, as it became the biggest hit from the album.

Track listing
Kukavica
Šta je to u tvojim venama
Popij me kao lek
Oprosti mi suze
Žarila sam žar
Ustani, budi se
Što si tako zaboravan
Zaboravi
Mesec, nebo, zvezdice

References

1993 albums
Ceca (singer) albums